The 2019–20 Rhode Island Rams basketball team represented the University of Rhode Island during the 2019–20 NCAA Division I men's basketball season. The Rams, led by second-year head coach David Cox, played their home games at the Ryan Center in Kingston, Rhode Island as members of the Atlantic 10 Conference. They finished the season 21–9, 13–5 in A-10 play to finish in third place. Their season ended with the A-10 tournament and all other postseason tournaments were canceled due to the ongoing coronavirus pandemic.

Previous season
The Rams finished the 2018–19 season 18–15, 9–9 in A-10 play to finish in ninth place. They defeated La Salle and VCU to advance to the semifinals of the A-10 tournament where they lost to St. Bonaventure.

Offseason

Departures

Incoming transfers

2019 recruiting class

2020 recruiting class

Scholarship Tree

Roster

Schedule and results

|-
!colspan=9 style=|Exhibition

|-
!colspan=9 style=| Non-conference regular season

|-
!colspan=12 style=| Atlantic 10 regular season

|-
!colspan=9 style=| Atlantic 10 tournament

Source

References

Rhode Island Rams men's basketball seasons
Rhode Island
Rhode Island
Rhode Island